Tkiyet Um Ali, is a Jordanian non-governmental organisation founded by Princess Haya in honour of her late mother Queen Alia.

The first initiative of its kind in Jordan and in the Arab World, Tkiyet Um Ali provides food and services to the less privileged sectors of Jordanian society, the needy and the hungry.

History
Tkiyet Um Ali (TUA) was founded in 2003 by Her Royal Highness Princess Haya Bint Al Hussein to represent the first initiative of its kind in the Arab World that seeks to eradicate hunger. TUA is also considered the first non-governmental organisation to provide sustainable food support through distributing food parcels and serving hot meals in addition to providing humanitarian food aid to Jordan's underprivileged. Originally conceptualised by Her Late Majesty Queen Alia more than 40 years ago.

Programmes
Tkiyet Um Ali seeks to serve as a model for hunger and relief initiatives across the rest of the Arab world. It is considered to be the first NGO in Jordan to serve hot meals and provide humanitarian aid on daily basis to the poor and needy from the Jordanian society in all locations. Currently Tkiyet Um Ali is reaching out to 30,000 households living in extreme poverty throughout the Hashemite Kingdom of Jordan. The households receive food parcel on monthly basis and throughout the year, the parcel includes 24 commodities enough to prepare three meals on daily basis throughout the month.

References

External links 
 Official website of the Tkiyet Um Ali (Arabic/English)
 Tkiyet Um Ali on Facebook
Tkiyet Um Ali on twitter

2002 establishments in Jordan
Organizations established in 2002
Non-profit organisations based in Jordan
Charities based in Amman